The montane mouse shrew (Myosorex blarina) is a species of mammal in the family Soricidae endemic to Uganda.  Its natural habitats are subtropical or tropical moist montane forests and swamps. It is threatened by habitat loss.

References

Mammals of Uganda
Myosorex
Endemic fauna of Uganda
Taxonomy articles created by Polbot
Mammals described in 1906
Taxa named by Oldfield Thomas